Mike Dottin (born August 13, 1978), also known by the stage names MeccaGodZilla, RYU BLACK or RAVAGE is an American underground rapper, visual artist, record producer and entrepreneur formerly of the Monsta Island Czars.

Early life and career
MeccaGodZilla was born in Brooklyn and raised in Freeport, Long Island. In 1998 he entered the music business while attending Hunter College and under the tutiledge of Omowale Adewale & M-1 (rapper) of dead prez, he became a founding member of G.A.ME in 2000 as head of the promotions and networking department.

In 2010, he moved to Tokyo and modeled for Japanese brands collab with NIKE and worked with Armani Exchange. Later, in 2011, he founded indie record label "Manafest Vision Media".

Discography

Appearances
 2004 –  Rodan – War in Heaven Pt. I, War in Heaven Pt. II, and Human Inquisition from Theophany: The Book Of Elevations 
 2005 – “Hasan Salaam – Paradise Lost”  Album A&R
 2006 – “Day By Day” ft Mez & Majesty on Hasan Salaam – Tales Of The Lost Tribe: Hidden Jewels
 2006 – MF Grimm - "The Path", "M.I.C.", "Brand New" from "American Hunger"
 2008 – Eric Bobo "Tread" ft Keen from "Meeting of the Minds Vol I" - Nacional Records
 2008 – Kong - Broken Safety, It's Official, Brown Eyes, What Had Happened Was, Ultimate Sacrifice, Slumz, War, Hated from “Shackles Off” 
 2008 –Vordul Mega - "Learn" from  "Megagraphiti" - Backwoodz Studioz
 2009 - Mega Ran "My Love" from "Mega Ran 9" - RandomBeats, LLC
 2009 - Junclassic  "Bionic 6" from "Imaginary Enemies" - Classified Records LLC
 2011 – Sick Team  "Tokyo Driftin" from Sick Team” - Jazzysport / Japan
 2011 -  Budamunk  "Seven MCs" from "Blunted Monkey Fist" - King Tone / Japan
 2012 -  Masia One  "Interlude - Broadway Culture" from "Bootleg Culture" - Merdeka Media Group
 2014 - Sim-E "Bang²" from "Sim-City" - Manafest Vision Media LLC.
 2019 – "Body In The Trunk" on Cryptik Soul - Killer's Blood

References

External links
 Manafest Vision Media Official website
 MeccaGodZilla Official website

Living people
1978 births
Underground rappers